Smethport is a borough and county seat of McKean County, Pennsylvania, United States. The mayor is Wayne V. Foltz. The population was 1,430 at the 2020 census.  Smethport is part of the Bradford, PA Micropolitan Statistical Area. Smethport, having the coldest temperature ever recorded in Pennsylvania, is the coldest place in Pennsylvania and one of the coldest towns in the contiguous United States.

History
Smethport is situated in the Pennsylvania Wilds region, in a hilly area a short distance from the Allegheny National Forest and Kinzua Bridge State Park. Smethport is about two hours from Erie and Buffalo. The highest point on U.S. Route 6 east of the Mississippi River is near Smethport at Bush Hill.

Smethport was founded in 1807 by Dutch land investors who were surveying a large tract of land they purchased from the Commonwealth of Pennsylvania, and was named in honor of a Dutch banking family, the De Smeths, who financed the land investments. The town's first business was a water-powered sawmill built by John Applebee in 1822. Smethport became the McKean County seat in 1826 and was incorporated as a Borough in 1853. The sawmill's artificial pond is now the centerpiece of Hamlin Park. Smethport has ties to General Thomas L. Kane who organized the Bucktail Regiment during the Civil War; the borough is home to an active group of Bucktail re-enactors.

The borough has been the location of offices for several forest industry firms. From the 1870s to the early 1900s, Smethport was an important center for the East Coast hardwoods industry and enjoyed a timber-fueled economic boom that allowed the construction of many mansions that today make up a historic architectural district.

The first magnetic toys in the country were invented in Smethport in 1908. The Wooly Willy toy, a hit in the 1950s and still in production, was created in Smethport by Donald and James Herzog of the Smethport Specialty Company. In 2004 Smethport was selected as Pennsylvania's first Route 6 Heritage Community, as a part of a heritage tourism development program.

Geography
Smethport is located at  (41.8099, -78.4449).

Climate
This climatic region is typified by large seasonal temperature differences, with warm to hot (and often humid) summers and cold (sometimes severely cold) winters.  According to the Köppen Climate Classification system, Smethport has a humid continental climate, abbreviated "Dfb" on climate maps.

The lowest temperature ever recorded in Pennsylvania, was at Smethport on January 5, 1904.

The central Appalachian region has experienced some of the largest rainfall accumulations in the world at time intervals less than 6 hours, including the 18 July 1942 Smethport, Pennsylvania, storm that produced 780 mm (30.7 inches) in less than 5 hours.

Demographics

As of the census of 2010, there were 1,655 people, 718 households, and 470 families residing in the borough. The population density was 1,009.5 people per square mile (389.3/km2). There were 801 housing units at an average density of 443.0 per square mile (170.9/km2). The racial makeup of the borough was 99.05% White, 0.00% African American, 0.00% Native American, 0.06% Asian, 0.12% from other races, and 0.18% from two or more races. Hispanic or Latino of any race were 0.59% of the population.

There were 686 households, out of which 33.1% had children under the age of 18 living with them, 52.8% were married couples living together, 10.6% had a female householder with no husband present, and 33.4% were non-families. 29.9% of all households were made up of individuals, and 15.3% had someone living alone who was 65 years of age or older. The average household size was 2.38 and the average family size was 2.94.

In the borough the population was spread out, with 26.0% under the age of 18, 6.7% from 18 to 24, 25.8% from 25 to 44, 22.7% from 45 to 64, and 18.9% who were 65 years of age or older. The median age was 40 years. For every 100 females there were 86.1 males. For every 100 females age 18 and over, there were 80.2 males.

The median income for a household in the borough was $34,934, and the median income for a family was $42,153. Males had a median income of $30,962 versus $22,159 for females. The per capita income for the borough was $17,297. About 7.6% of families and 8.0% of the population were below the poverty line, including 9.4% of those under age 18 and 8.2% of those age 65 or over.

Notable Businesses
Smethport Specialty Company, which manufactured Wooly Willy and other magnetic toys. (Sold to Patch Products, August 2008. Plant shut down February 2014.)

America's First Christmas Store, opened in 1935 and was the nation's first year-round yuletide shop. (closed 2005)

Hamlin Bank and Trust Company, a community bank founded by Henry Hamlin in 1863. "Hamlin Bank"

Chef Specialties Company, founded in 1940, is America's first manufacturer and purveyor of pepper and spice mills.  "Chef Specialties"

Backus Company, a precision metal stamping manufacturer, founded in 1906.

Education
Smethport is served by the Smethport Area School District. It operates one elementary school and one high school.

Trivia

Home of the "Hubbers" - the local school district's mascot. Hubber refers to the fact that Smethport is in the approximate geographic center of McKean County and is the county seat; therefore it is the "hub" of the county. The logo for the school is an orange and black wagon wheel tilted to one side with the letters "S" and "A" for Smethport Area.

Smethport is the location of one of the largest, documented short duration storms in world history.

References

External links

 Smethport Borough - News Site
 Smethport Area School District
 Smethport History
 Smethport Area High School alumni
 Smethport, PA Weather and Webcam